Stephen Robert Pettifer (born September 21, 1970) is a Professor in the Department of Computer Science at the University of Manchester in England.

Education
Pettifer completed his Bachelor of Science degree and PhD in the Department of Computer Science, and work on virtual reality under the supervision of Adrian West in 1999.

Research and career
Pettifer's research interests are centred on the design of advanced interfaces for computer systems, in particular: scientific visualisation, scholarly publishing, and virtual reality. His main research project revolves around Utopia Documents, a novel tool for interacting with the scientific literature.

He is a co-author of the bioinformatics textbook Bioinformatics Challenges at the Interface of Biology and Computer Science: Mind the Gap with Terri Attwood and Dave Thorne.

 Pettifer teaches on part of the Advanced Computer Graphics course and Fundamentals of Distributed Systems.

References

Academics of the University of Manchester
People associated with the Department of Computer Science, University of Manchester
Living people
1970 births